Bruce Comben (25 October 1930 – 15 December 2002) was an Australian rules footballer in the Victorian Football League (VFL).

Comben made his debut for the Carlton Football Club in the Round 1 of the 1950 season. He retired from the game at the end of the 1961 season. During his time at the club, he was Captain from 1958 to 1960, and won Best and Fairest in both 1957 and 1958. He was inducted into the Carlton Hall of Fame in 1989.

Bruce died in 2002. He owned supermarkets in the Laverton and Werribee area, when they were named SSW. However, the Werribee branch closed and the Laverton store became Comben's IGA. Recently, the Laverton store has been sold and will no longer be called Comben's IGA.

Bruce was a two time best and fairest winner for the Carlton Football Club and was named as back pocket in their team of the century.

References

External links
 Bruce Comben at Blueseum

1930 births
Carlton Football Club players
Werribee Football Club coaches
John Nicholls Medal winners
Australian rules footballers from Victoria (Australia)
2002 deaths